Charlie Mackesy (born 11 December 1962) is a British artist, illustrator, and the author of The Boy, the Mole, the Fox and the Horse.

Career
Mackesy began his career as a cartoonist for The Spectator, before becoming a book illustrator for Oxford University Press. He also worked with Richard Curtis on the set of Love Actually to create a set of drawings to be auctioned for Comic Relief; he has continued to work with the charity that he loves. He was selected to work on Nelson Mandela's Unity Series project, a lithograph project working together with Mandela on the drawings he made. 

His bronzes can be found in public spaces in London, including Highgate Cemetery and the Brompton Road. His paintings have been exhibited widely, most frequently with galleries in London and New York. 

His work has been featured in books, private collections, galleries, magazine covers, street lamp posts, school classrooms, cafés, women's safe houses, churches, prisons, hospital wards, and countless other public spaces around the world. Mackesy was contacted by an editor who had seen his drawings on Instagram and subsequently published with her on Ebury Press. The Boy, the Mole, the Fox and the Horse, was first published in October 2019, and has spent over 100 weeks on the Sunday Times Bestsellers List top ten; it is the longest Sunday Times Hardback Number One of all time. His book was selected as the Waterstones Book of the Year 2019 and the Barnes and Noble Book of the Year 2019 (the first ever book to be awarded both in the same year) and was shortlisted for the British Book Awards in 2020.

Mackesy was amongst the winners of the 2020 Nielsen Bestseller Awards, with The Boy, the Mole, the Fox and the Horse achieving Platinum status. All titles that achieve Platinum status are inducted into the "21st century Hall of Fame", which now includes 149 titles. In 2020, eight books passed the Platinum Award million copy sales threshold. Mackesy was awarded Maddox Gallery Artist of the Year at the GQ Men of the Year Awards in 2020 and Illustrator of the Year at the British Book Awards in 2021. Mackesy co-directed and co-wrote the animated short film based on the book. In March 2023, Mackesy and Matthew Freud won the Oscar for Animated Short Film for The Boy, the Mole, the Fox and the Horse.

Personal life
Mackesy grew up in Northumberland and attended Radley College and Queen Elizabeth High School, Hexham. He also briefly attended university twice, but left on both occasions within a week.

Mackesy’s paternal grandparents were Major General Pierse Joseph Mackesy and writer Leonora Mackesy (born 1902), who wrote Harlequin romances as Leonora Starr and Dorothy Rivers.

He has lived and painted in South Africa, Sub-Saharan Africa, and the United States. He resides between Brixton, south London and Suffolk with his dog Barney. Away from art Mackesy co-runs Mama Buci, a honey social enterprise in Zambia, and has helped to run a homeless project in London.

References

External links
 Official website

1962 births
Annie Award winners
British artists
British painters
British writers
Living people
Directors of Best Animated Short Academy Award winners